Vidya Subramanian  is a Carnatic style vocalist and teacher. She is Founder of Vidya Subramanian Academy. She is a disciple of Padmabhushan Lalgudi Sri Jayaraman. In addition to this, she is a Chartered accountant, with an MBA from Boston College "which has enabled me to emerge as a successful entrepreneur with my online Carnatic music academy and has also helped me make award winning grant proposals". She lives in Chennai, India.

Awards won by Vidya
 Women Transforming India Award (2021) from NITI Aayog (award supported by United Nations - India, FICCI and various corporate partners
Kalaimamani award from Tamil Nadu Government (2018)
Champion of Chennai for Education (2022) from KSA Trust
2018 Homepreneur Award (Home professionals category))
Thanjavur Kalyanaraman Endowment Award from Sri Krishna Gana Sabha (2011)
Special Award from Sree Rama Seva Mandali, Bangalore (2011) 
2010 Artist grant award from Saratoga Arts from New York State Council on the Arts (NYSCA) under the Saratoga Program for Arts Funding (SPAF) 
 SOS Artist Grant from New York State Foundation for the Arts (NYFA) in 2009, 2010 and 2011 
2009's Arts Grant award from the Town of Clifton Park's Arts and Culture Commission.

Vidya co-hosts a podcast series on Carnatic music called Raaga Rasika.

References

External links 

Women Carnatic singers
Carroll School of Management alumni
Living people
Year of birth missing (living people)